Peter Ostroushko (August 12, 1953 – February 24, 2021) was an American violinist and mandolinist. He performed regularly on the radio program A Prairie Home Companion and with a variety of bands and orchestras in Minneapolis–Saint Paul and nationally. He won a regional Emmy Award for the soundtrack he composed for the documentary series Minnesota: A History of the Land (2005).

Background and career
Born August 12, 1953, and of Ukrainian ancestry, Ostroushko grew up in northeast Minneapolis where he first took up mandolin at age three. He released numerous recordings and was a regular performer on the A Prairie Home Companion radio program.

Bob Dylan, Willie Nelson, mandolin
Ostroushko's first recording session was an uncredited mandolin player on Bob Dylan's Blood on the Tracks. He toured with Robin and Linda Williams, Norman Blake, and Chet Atkins. Ostroushko also worked with Emmylou Harris, Willie Nelson, Johnny Gimble, Greg Brown, and John Hartford among many others.

Orchestral
Ostroushko performed with the Minnesota Orchestra and the Saint Paul Chamber Orchestra. Ostroushko's compositions have been performed by the Saint Paul Chamber Orchestra, the Minnesota Sinfonia, the Rochester Symphony Orchestra, the Des Moines Symphony, and the Kremlin Chamber Orchestra. Music from Heart of the Heartland was used by Ken Burns for the PBS documentary Lewis & Clark: The Journey of the Corps of Discovery, and his arrangement of "Sweet Betsy from Pike" was used in Burns's Mark Twain. He has also composed music for shows by Circus Juventas, a Saint Paul youth circus.

Television and radio
Ostroushko appeared on television on Austin City Limits, Late Night with David Letterman, and Mister Rogers' Neighborhood, as well as performing regularly on Garrison Keillor's A Prairie Home Companion.

Awards
Ostroushko received a regional Emmy award for his soundtrack to the 2005 PBS series Minnesota: A History of the Land.

Personal
Ostroushko was married to public radio producer Marge Ostroushko. They have one daughter, Anna.

Ostroushko suffered a stroke in January 2018 and stopped performing. A GoFundMe page was set up to assist with medical bills. He died of heart failure on February 24, 2021, at the age of 67.

Discography
Adapted from Apple Music and AllMusic.
Sluz Duz Music (1985) Rounder
Down the Streets of My Old Neighborhood (1986) Rounder
	Peter Ostroushko Presents the Mando Boys (1986) Red House
Buddies of Swing (1987) Red House
Blue Mesa (1989) Red House
Duo (1991) Red House (with Dean Magraw)
Heart of the Heartland (1995) Red House
Pilgrims on the Heart Road (1997) Red House
Sacred Heart (2000) Red House
Meeting on Southern Soil (2002) Red House (with Norman Blake)
Coming Down from Red Lodge (2003) Red House
Minnesota: A History of the Land (2005) Red House
The Heartland Holiday Concert (2005) Red House
Postcards (2006) Red House 
The Mando Boys Live: Holstein Lust (2006) Borderland
Peter Joins the Circus (2008)
When the Last Morning Glory Blooms (2010) (Red House)
The Mando Chronicles (2012) (Red House)

References

External links
Peter Ostroushko official site

 
 
 Audio clip: Lafayette/ Turtle Dove – Peter Ostroushko, Shoe Band, GK and Andra Suchy, 2/20/2010.

1953 births
2021 deaths
American fiddlers
American mandolinists
Ukrainian-Americans
Musicians from Minneapolis
21st-century violinists
Red House Records artists
Rounder Records artists